Jiubujiang Town is an urban town in You County, Hunan Province, People's Republic of China.

Cityscape
The town is divided into 11 villages and two communities, the following areas: Jiangbei Community, Dongtian Community, Shetian Village, Baishichong Village, Zheshuang Village, Jiuxianhu Village, Cilian Village, Huangzhu Village, Mulian Village, Daqin Village, Liantang Village, Pu'anqiao Village, and Datian Village.

References

External links

Divisions of You County